Hans Hermann Schaufuß (13 July 1893 – 30 January 1982) was a German actor. He appeared in more than one hundred films from 1922 to 1969. His sons were actors Hans Joachim Schaufuß and Peter-Timm Schaufuß.

Selected filmography

References

External links 

1893 births
1982 deaths
German male film actors
German male silent film actors
20th-century German male actors
Male actors from Berlin